Theatre pedagogy is an independent discipline combining both theatre and pedagogy. As a field that arose during the 20th century, theatre pedagogy has developed separately from drama education, the distinction being that the drama teacher typically teaches method, theory and/or practice of performance alone, while theatre pedagogy integrates both art and education to develop language and strengthen social awareness. Theatre pedagogy is rooted in drama and stagecraft, yet works to educate people outside the realm of theatre itself.

History

As a movement, theatre pedagogy has many founders. In Germany, where it is widely recognized and practiced, Hans-Wolfgang Nickel is cited as a pioneer in theatre pedagogy with the founding of the Berlin Stage Teachers in 1959. Nickel later became a professor of theatre games and educational activities at the Berlin School of Education in 1974.

Another well known German theatre pedagogue is Hans Martin Ritter who, starting in 1973, ran a series of tests using Bertholt Brecht's model of learning through play. Ritter's aim was to develop an interdisciplinary project method for the school using theater as a form of teaching and learning. These tests led Ritter to co-found a nationwide pilot program in merging the fields of theatre and education.

Perhaps theatre pedagogy's most internationally known theorist and practitioner is Brazilian director/facilitator Augusto Boal, who created Theatre of the Oppressed, now practiced by millions of people in more than 70 nations.

Description

The primary purpose of theatre pedagogy is to bring about change in understanding the world around us. In achieving this objective, several other skills are taught and learned. These include:

 Developing language, including non-verbal and non-written language.
 Honing drama skills and a theatrical vocabulary.
 Use of collective action to overcome problems in the community.

Theatre pedagogy enhances these forms of communication to facilitate human interaction, helping participants to learn about themselves, their peers, and their surrounding world. Rooted both in traditional education and amateur theater, the field of theatre pedagogy has grown to span many sectors, including:

 Use of drama in the social sphere, such as work in prisons, with people in recovery, as violence prevention, etc.
 Theatrical collaboration between laypeople and actors.
 As education, both in ordinary schools and in the theatre.
 In medical education improving communication between faculty and students and between physicians and patients.
 In job training, integrating kinesthetic learning to teach public speaking, body language awareness, motivational training, etc.
 Developing contact between theatre-makers and their audiences.
 Specific theatrical techniques and dramatic forms, such as Forum Theatre and other methods from the Theatre of the Oppressed.

Practitioners of theatre pedagogy operate with a situation-oriented educational framework, usually using the medium of theatre as a vehicle to achieve an objective. Through this method, theatre pedagogy gives access to participants' own ideas and impulses, expanding the avenues of communication and interaction with the self and one's sociocultural environment. Through the use of gesture, intonation, facial expression, and behavior onstage, participants analyze these performative aspects created by the dramatic tension of everyday life. Through these physical and personality-affected models, real-life situations can more clearly express themselves.

Training

Theatre pedagogy is taught at universities and colleges, though training in the field is not regulated by state guidelines. In Germany one can receive  a theatre pedagogy degree both at the undergraduate and graduate level, and many German cities have theatre pedagogy centers that provide less formal and unregulated training. Similar to these are the Centers for Theatre of the Oppressed, such as CTO Rio in Brazil and the Theatre of the Oppressed Laboratory in New York City where people can receive theatre pedagogy training using Augusto Boal and Paulo Freire's methods.

In the United States, three higher education institutions with strong theatre and drama pedagogy programs are CUNY School of Professional Studies MA in Applied Theatre, New York University Steinhardt's Educational Theatre program, and Emerson College's MA in Theatre Education.

See also
 Pedagogy of the Oppressed
 Performance studies
 Social pedagogy
 Theatre of the Oppressed

Notes

References
 Tanja Bidlo: Theatre Pedagogy. Introduction. Oldib Verlag, Essen, 2006
 Hans Hoppe: Theatre and Education. Principles, criteria, models of educational theater. Lit Verlag, Munster 2003.2. Aufl.2011, 
 Felix Rellstab: drama Manual, Volume 4, theater education. Stutz Publishing Printing Ltd., CH-2000 Wädenswil
 Gerd Koch / Marianne Streisand (eds): Dictionary of Theatre Education, Berlin Milow 2003: Schibri
 Marianne Streisand / Susan Hentschel / Andreas Poppe / Bernd Ruping (eds): Generations in the conversation. Archaeology of Theatre Pedagogy I. Schibri-Verlag, 2005 Milow
 Jürgen Weintz: Theatre Education and Dramatic Art. Aesthetic and psycho-social experience by working role. Schribri-Verlag, Milow, 2007,

External links
 Bundesverband Theaterpädagogik (Theatre Pedagogy Association)
 Fachverband Theaterpädagogik Schweiz (Theatre Pedagogy Association Switzerland)
  Übersicht anerkannter Ausbildungen (Overview of recognized training)
 Ratgeber zur Ausbildung Theaterpädagogik (Guide to Education Theatre Pedagogy)
 Beschreibung des Berufsbilds beim Deutschen Bühnenverein (Description of the profession at the German Theater Association)
 Centre for Community Dialogue and Change, India: Breaking Patterns, Creating Change - Conducting Theatre of the Oppressed Workshops and Research  especially in Education and Healthcare

Theatre
Pedagogy
Political theatre forms
Theatrical genres
Theatre in Germany